Sue Ellen Wallis (October 9, 1957 – January 28, 2014) was an American politician. She was a Republican member of the Wyoming House of Representatives who represented District 52 from January 2007 until her death in January 2014.

Personal life
Wallis, who attended the University of Wyoming at Laramie, was a rancher and the daughter of former legislator Dick Wallis. She had resided in Recluse.

Elections
2012, Wallis won the three-way August 21, 2012 Republican primary with 520 votes (44.5%), and was unopposed for the November 6, 2012 general election, winning with 2,939 votes.
2006, When Republican Representative Burke Jackson did not seek re-election to the District 52 seat in the Wyoming House, Wallis won the August 22, 2006 Republican primary with 818 votes (52.3%), and was unopposed for the November 7, 2006 General election, winning with 2,238 votes.
2008, Wallis was unopposed for both the August 19, 2008 Republican primary, winning with 1,111 votes, and she won the November 4, 2008 general election with 3,462 votes.
2010, Wallis won the August 17, 2010 Republican primary with 1,022 votes (50.3%), and won the three-way November 2, 2010 general election with 1,687 votes (57.2%) against Independent candidate Travis Hakert and Libertarian Nicholas De Laat.

Death
Wallis was found dead at age 56 on January 28, 2014, at a hotel in her native Gillette, Wyoming. The cause of death has not yet been disclosed.

References

External links
Official page at the Wyoming Legislature

 

1957 births
2014 deaths
Republican Party members of the Wyoming House of Representatives
People from Gillette, Wyoming
University of Wyoming alumni
Women state legislators in Wyoming
Ranchers from Wyoming
21st-century American politicians
21st-century American women politicians